The Liberal Democratic Party (LDP) is a liberal political party in Serbia. It is led by Čedomir Jovanović.

History
The Liberal Democratic Party was founded on 5 November 2005 by former members of the Democratic Party, led by Čedomir Jovanović, who were expelled in a party purge in 2004. Jovanović had become critical of the new direction of the Democratic Party and its newly elected president, Boris Tadić. The LDP gained its first seat in parliament after Đorđe Đukić defected from the Democratic Party. Members of the foundation board were: Nenad Prokić, Nikola Samardžić, Branislav Lečić and Đorđe Đukić. in 2007 the Civic Alliance of Serbia merged into the LDP. The LDP has a long-standing relationship with the Social Democratic Union and League of Social Democrats of Vojvodina.

Ideology 
LDP is a liberal party, and it is supportive of secularism and multiculturalism. It has been also described as progressive and social liberal. The LDP is one of the few political parties in Serbia to actively support Serbia's membership into NATO and the independence of Kosovo. The LDP is also highly supportive of LGBT rights in Serbia. Regarding the economy, it is classical-liberal, market-orientated, and supports privatization, although it is also in favor of social welfare. Additionally, it economic beliefs been described as neoliberal, libertarian, and conservative-liberal.

Its political positions have been described as centrist, although its social policies are positioned on the left-wing, while it is economically orientated towards the right.

Presidents of the Liberal Democratic Party

Electoral performance
The LDP's first electoral performance was during the 2007 Serbian parliamentary election, the LDP ran in a coalition together with the Civic Alliance of Serbia, the Social Democratic Union and the League of Social Democrats of Vojvodina which collectively received 5.31% of the popular vote. The Civic Alliance would later merge into the LDP the same year.

The next election followed a year later, with the LDP receiving only 5.24% of the popular vote, its worst performance to date.

The Liberal Democratic Party competed in the 2012 Serbian parliamentary election as part of the U-Turn coalition. The coalition received 6.53% of the popular vote.

In the 2014 Serbian parliamentary elections, LDP participated in the coalition with the Social Democratic Union and the Bosniak Democratic Union of Sandžak. However, the coalition did not win any seats in the National Assembly as it only received 3.36% of the popular vote.

In the 2016 Serbian parliamentary elections, LDP participated in the coalition with the Social Democratic Party and the League of Social Democrats of Vojvodina. The coalition received 5.02% of the popular vote and gained 13 seats in the National Assembly with LDP receiving 4 seats.

In the 2020 Serbian parliamentary elections, LDP led a coalition called "Coalition for Peace" along with the Vlach National Party and other small Bosniak, Romani, Romanian, and Montenegrin political organizations. However, the coalition had the worst result in LDP's history and it failed to pass the 3% electoral threshold.

Parliamentary elections

Presidential elections

See also
Liberalism in Serbia

References

External links

2005 establishments in Serbia
Alliance of Liberals and Democrats for Europe Party member parties
Centrist parties in Serbia
Liberal parties in Serbia
Political parties established in 2005
Pro-European political parties in Serbia
Social liberal parties
Democratic Party (Serbia) breakaway groups
Classical liberal parties
Progressive parties
Conservative liberal parties
Secularism in Serbia
Multiculturalism in Europe